Don't Say Goodbye may refer to:

 Don't Say Goodbye (album), by Strawbs, 1987

Songs 
 "Don't Say Goodbye" (Human Nature song), 1997
 "Don't Say Good-Bye" (Melon Kinenbi song), 2009
 "Don't Say Goodbye" (Paulina Rubio song), 2002
 "Don't Say Goodbye" (Rick Astley song), 1987
 "Don't Say Goodbye" (Sérgio Mendes song), 2014
 "Don't Say Goodbye", by Aaron Carter from Love, 2018
 "Don't Say Goodbye", by the Bee Gees, B-side of the single "Peace of Mind", 1964
 "Don't Say Goodbye", by Crosby, Stills, Nash & Young from American Dream, 1988
 "Don't Say Goodbye", by Davichi from Love Delight, 2011
 "GLaDOS' Song", also known as "Don't Say Goodbye", a song written by Ellen McLain for Portal 2 but not included in the game, released 2015
 "Don't Say Goodbye", by Milk Inc., 2014
 "Don't Say Goodbye", by the Moonglows, 1957
 "Don't Say Goodbye", by Olly Murs from Olly Murs, 2010
 "Don't Say Goodbye", by Alok & Ilkay Sencan featuring Tove Lo, single, 2020